Frege: Philosophy of Language (1973; second edition 1981) is a book about the philosopher Gottlob Frege by the British philosopher Michael Dummett.

Reception
Frege: Philosophy of Language has been highly influential. Together with Frege: Philosophy of Mathematics (1991), it is Dummett's chief contribution to Frege scholarship. However, Dummett's epistemological interpretation of the idea of a route to reference has been seen as unnecessary by the philosopher Daniel Dennett. The philosopher Roger Scruton endorsed Dennett's view.

References

Bibliography
Books

 
 
 

1973 non-fiction books
Books about Gottlob Frege
Books by Michael Dummett
English-language books
Philosophy of language literature
British non-fiction books